Eucalyptus scopulorum is a species of small tree that is endemic to a small area of northern New South Wales. It has rough ironbark on the trunk and branches, lance-shaped adult leaves, flower buds in groups of seven, white flowers and barrel-shaped or conical fruit.

Description
It has soft, corky, pale grey bark on the trunk and branches. Flowering has been recorded in October and the flowers are white.

Taxonomy and naming
Eucalyptus scopulorum was first formally described in 1997 by Ken Hill in the journal Telopea from specimens he collected in the Gibraltar Range State Forest in 1996. The specific epithet (scopulorum) is from the Latin word scopulus meaning "a cliff", referring to the usual habitat of this species.

Distribution and habitat
This eucalypt grows in rocky crevices on steep cliffs and is only known in a few places on the Gibraltar Range.

References

scopulorum
Myrtales of Australia
Flora of New South Wales
Trees of Australia
Plants described in 1997